Ogmore is a rural town and coastal locality in the Livingstone Shire, Queensland, Australia.

Geography 
The north-eastern boundary of the locality is Broad Sound with the Styx River (also known as Tooloombah Creek) flowing through Ogmore into the sound.

The Bruce Highway passes from south to north through the locality, but passes to the west of the town.

The North Coast railway line also passes from south to north through the locality to the east of the highway and passes through the town. The locality is served by a number of railway stations (from north to south):

 Styx railway station, now abandoned
 Ogmore railway station, serving the town
 Bowman railway station, now abandoned
 Strathmuir railway station, now abandoned
 Kooltandra railway station

The town of Ogmore is located on the east bank of Styx River slightly north of the centre of the locality. There are also a number of neighbourhoods in the locality:

 Bowman

 Strathmuir

 Styx, in a pocket of the Styx River north-west of the town of Ogmore

 Tooloombah, an abandoned town
The locatity has the following mountains and a mountain pass:

 Bald Hills 
 Blacktop 
 Cliff Peak 
 Fort St John
 Gilnorchie Peak 
 Langdale Hill
 Mount Bison 
 Mount Brunswick 
 Mount Lorne 
 Mount Mamelon 
 Mount Michael 
 Mount Phillip 
 Mount Sarsfield 
 Mount Wellington 
 Rocky Peak 
 The Sisters

 Cattle Gap, a mountain pass

History 

Ogmore was originally known as Harley, taking its name from its railway station. However, to avoid confusion with Hartley in New South Wales, on 20 January 1933 it was renamed Ogmore after the coal-mining town and river in Glamorganshire, Wales.

The neighbourhood of Bowman takes its  its name from the Bowman railway station, which was named by the Queensland Railways Department on 26 October 1923 after politician David Bowman.

The name Styx is a reference to the River Styx which separates the living from the dead in Greek mythology.The Styx railway station was named on 4 January 1918 by the Queensland Railways Department, but presumably refers to the river in this locality, which was already named at that time.

Styx No 3 coal mine opened near Ogmore in 1924.

Styx Coal Mine Provisional School opened on 3 May 1921. It operated as a part-time school in conjunction with the Styx River Provisional School (meaning they shared a single teacher) until it closed on 11 November 1921. On 22 May 1922, it reopened at a new location but still called Styx Coal Mine Provisional School. On 8 May 1923, it reopened as Bowman State School. It closed in 1926.

Styx River Provisional School opened on 7 October 1919 and closed on 12 Nov 1920. It reopened on 4 July 1921 and operated as a half-time school with Styx Coal Mine Provisional School until 11 November 1921. On 8 May 1923 it became Styx River State School. It closed in 1942. It was on Styx Road. 

Hartley Provisional School opened on 26 May 1924 and became Hartley State School in 1929. It was renamed Ogmore State School in March 1933. It closed in 1999. It was at 2-4 Wilangi Street.

The Ogmore Emergency Hospital was opened on Sunday 15 May 1949 by the Minister for Lands, Tom Foley. The wooden building cost £4235 and could accommodate 4 patients in normal circumstances and 10 in an emergency. Its role was to provide out-patient services while in-patient services would generally be limited to patients waiting to be transferred to a more major hospital or after discharge from a more major hospital. It could also be used as a clinic by visiting dentists.

In April 1954, a goods train derailed near Ogmore. A bulldozer travelling on a flat bed carriage was believed to have shifted on the carriage, overturning the carriage.

The Styx mines closed in the 1960s. Queensland Rail disbanded its railway gang based in Ogmore in the 1990s. This caused the town's population to decline to about 30 people.

Proposed coal mine 
In December 2016, a new coal mine was proposed for the Styx River basin 4 km south of the town. The proposal involves two open-cut pits to be mined by the truck-and-shovel methodology and will require a loading facility onto the North Coast railway line. The project is currently undergoing environmental impact assessment. The workforce of 200-250 people is expected to be recruited from the local area, including Ogmore and its neighbouring towns of Marlborough and St Lawrence. In April 2021, the environmental impact assessment determined that the project had too many environmental risks to proceed based on the current proposal.

Education 
There are no schools in Ogmore. The nearest government primary schools are Marlborough State School in neighbouring Marlborough to the south, St Lawrence State School in neighbouring St Lawrence to the north-west, and Clarke Creek State School in neighbouring Clarke Creek to the west. There are no secondary schools nearby; the options are distance education and boarding school.

References

Further reading

External links 

 

Towns in Queensland
Shire of Livingstone
Coastline of Queensland
Localities in Queensland